is a Japanese footballer currently playing as a midfielder for Fukushima United.

Career statistics

Club
''Updated to January 1st, 2022.

Notes

References

External links

1996 births
Living people
People from Takasaki, Gunma
Sportspeople from Gunma Prefecture
Association football people from Gunma Prefecture
Nihon University alumni
Japanese footballers
Association football midfielders
J3 League players
Fukushima United FC players